David Anthony may refer to:

 David Anthony (wheelchair rugby) (born 1981), British wheelchair rugby athlete
 David Anthony (politician) (born 1955), member of the Michigan House of Representatives
 David Brynmor Anthony (1886–1966), teacher and academic administrator
 David W. Anthony ( 1987–), author of The Horse, the Wheel and Language

See also 
 Anthony David (disambiguation)